Widad Kawar, was born in Tulkarm city in 1931, is an internationally renowned collector of Jordanian and Palestinian ethnic and cultural arts. She has amassed an extensive collection of dresses, costumes, textiles, and jewelry over the past 50 years, seeking to preserve a culture that has been largely dispersed by conflict. Kawar is known as Umm l'ibas al-falastini—the mother of Palestinian dress.

Biography
Kawar was born in Tulkarm city to a christian family in The Tulkarm city. Her father Jalil was an accomplished teacher and head of juvenile school system in British Mandate government of Palestine. She studied at the American University of Beirut. Kawar has made her collection available for public viewing and has mounted exhibits of Palestinian dress around the world. She has written many books on Palestinian embroidery and is seeking to establish a Gallery of Cultural Embroidery. Recently, she collaborated with Margaret Skinner on A Treasury of Stitches: Palestinian Embroidery Motifs, 1850–1950 (Rimal/Melisende).

Widad is currently a member of the Board of Trustees of the American Center for Oriental Research. She has recently established the Tiraz Centre which runs small museum in Amman, housing her collection and dedicated to the preservation of Jordanian and Palestinian cultural traditions.

Published work
Kawar, Widad: Threads of Identity: Preserving Palestinian Costume and Heritage  Rimal Publications. 2011
Kawar, Widad: Pracht Und Geheimnis - Kleidung Und Schmuck Aus Palästina Und Jordanien  Rautenstrauch-Joest Museum Munich. 1987
Kawar, Widad and Tania Nasir: Palestinian Embroidery : Traditional "Fallahi" Cross-Stitch . Munich, State Museum of Ethnography. 1992.
Widad Kawar and Shelagh Weir: Costumes and Wedding Customs in Bayt Dajan.

See also
Palestinian costumes

References

External links
Official website
https://web.archive.org/web/20061010090126/http://www.arabheritage.org/ Official website

Living people
American University of Beirut alumni
Collectors
Palestinian clothing
Palestinian women
People from Tulkarm
1931 births
Palestinian non-fiction writers